Juan Martin Goity (born 8 May 1983 in Puerto Madryn) is a German international rugby union player of Argentinian descent, playing for the German national rugby union team.

Goity played one game for Germany, against a Welsh Districts XV on 28 November 2008. At the time, he was playing in England, for Newmarket RFC.

Stats
Juan Martin Goity's personal statistics in club and international rugby:

National team

 As of 26 March 2010

References

External links
 Juan Martin Goity at scrum.com
 Juan Martin Goity profile at mybestplay.com
 Player profiles at the Newmarket RFC website

1983 births
Living people
People from Puerto Madryn
Argentine rugby union players
German rugby union players
Germany international rugby union players
Argentine people of German descent
Rugby union centres
Argentine expatriate sportspeople in England
Argentine expatriate rugby union players
Expatriate rugby union players in England